A flywheel-storage power system uses a flywheel for energy storage, (see Flywheel energy storage) and can be a comparatively small storage facility with a peak power of up to 20 MW. It typically is used to stabilize to some degree power grids, to help them stay on the grid frequency,  and to serve as a short-term compensation storage. Unlike common storage power plants, such as the pumped storage power plants with capacities up to 1000 MWh, the benefits from flywheel storage power plants can be obtained with a facility in the range of a few kWh to several tens of MWh. They are comparable in this application with battery storage power plants.

Possible areas of application are places where electrical energy can be obtained and stored, and must be supplied again to compensate for example, fluctuations in the seconds range in wind or solar power. These storage facilities consist of individual flywheels in a modular design. Energy up to 150 kWh can be absorbed or released per flywheel. Through combinations of several such flywheel accumulators, which are individually housed in buried underground vacuum tanks, a total power of up to several tens of MWh can be achieved. The electrical connections power low voltage motors via a DC intermediate circuit and the power converter systems are comparable to those found in plants used in the high-voltage direct current transmissions application.

Sometimes battery storage power stations are built with flywheel storage power systems in order to conserve battery power. Flywheels can handle rapid fluctuations better.

Application examples

Vehicle braking and acceleration
In vehicles small storage of power flywheels are used as an additional mechanism with batteries, to store the braking energy by regeneration. Power can be stored in the short term and then released back into the acceleration phase of a vehicle with very large electrical currents. This conserves battery power.

Tram braking and acceleration – power smoothing 
Flywheel storage has proven to be useful in trams. During braking (such as when arriving at a station), high energy peaks are found which can not be always fed back into the power grid due to the potential danger of overloading the system. The flywheel energy storage power plants are in containers on side of the tracks and take the excess electrical energy. For example, up to 200 MWh energy per brake system is annually recovered in Zwickau.

Power grid frequency control
In Stephentown, New York, Beacon Power operates in a flywheel storage power plant with 200 flywheels of 25 kWh capacity and 100 kWh of power. Ganged together this gives 5 MWh capacity and 20 MWh of power. The units operate at a peak speed at 15,000 rpm. The rotor flywheel consists of wound CFRP fibers which are filled with resin. The installation is intended primarily for frequency control. This service is sold to the New York power grid.

Stadtwerke München (SWM, Munich, Germany) uses a flywheel storage power system to stabilize the power grid, as well as control energy and to compensate for deviations from renewable energy sources. The plant originates from the Jülich Stornetic GmbH. The system consists of 28 flywheels and has a capacity of 100 kWh and a capacity of 600 kilovolt-amperes (kVA). The flywheels rotate at a peak speed of 45,000 rpm.

In Ontario, Canada, Temporal Power Ltd. has operated a flywheel storage power plant since 2014. It consists of 10 flywheels made of steel. Each flywheel weighs four tons and is 2.5 meters high. The maximum rotational speed is 11,500 rpm. The maximum power is 2 MWh. The system is used for frequency regulation. After a successful three-year trial period, the system is to be expanded to 20 MWh and 100 MWh.

Renewable energy time shift
The city of Fresno in California is running flywheel storage power plants built by Amber Kinetics to store solar energy, which is produced in excess quantity in the daytime, for consumption at night.

Deployed systems 
On the island of Aruba is currently a 5 MWh flywheel storage power plant built by Temporal Power Ltd. The island intends to convert its energy supply to 100 percent renewables by 2020.

Energy loss
It is now (since 2013) possible to build a flywheel storage system that loses just 5 percent of the energy stored in it, per day (i.e. the self-discharge rate).

See also
 Search for the Super Battery (2017 PBS film)

References

Energy storage
Power stations